Jābir ibn ʿAbd Allāh ibn ʿAmr ibn Ḥarām al-Anṣārī (died 697 CE/78 AH), was a prominent companion of the Islamic prophet Muhammad.

Life

Early life
Jabir ibn ʿAbd Allah al-Ansari was born in Yathrib (now known as Medina) 15 years before the Hijra. He belonged to a poor family of Medina. He was from the tribe of Khazraj. His mother was Nasiba bint Uqba ibn Uddi.

Muhammad's era
Jabir ibn Abd Allah al-Ansari is said to have accepted Islam when he was about 7. Also, he is recognised as the Sahaba with the most count of hadith relating to Hajj.

His participation in the Battle of Badr is questioned by some historians; he is known to have fought in 19 battles (including Badr) under command of Muhammad and was a trusted Sahabi. He was present during the conquest of Mecca.

Battle of Uhud
In the Battle of Uhud, Jabir ibn Abd Allah was not allowed by his father Abd Allah to take part in Jihad. Jabir had seven sisters (some historians say nine) and Abd Allah wanted him to take care of his family. So instead of fighting, Jabir served the thirsty soldiers. Jabir's father, Abd Allah ibn Amr ibn Haram al-Ansari was martyred in the Battle of Uhud along with his brother-in-law, Amr ibn al-Jamuh, both having reached nearly 100 years of age.

Miracle of the date pile
Jabir narrates, "When the season of plucking the dates came, I went to Allah's Messenger and said, "You know that my father was martyred on the day of Uhud, and he was heavily in debt, and I would like that the creditors should see you." The Prophet said, "Go and pile every kind of dates apart." I did so and called him (i.e. the Prophet). When the creditors saw him, they started claiming their debts from me then in such a harsh manner (as they had never done before). So when he saw their attitude, he went round the biggest heap of dates thrice, and then sat over it and said, 'O Jabir, call your companions (i.e. the creditors).' Then he kept on measuring (and giving) to the creditors (their due) till Allah paid all the debt of my father. I would have been satisfied to retain nothing of those dates for my sisters after Allah had paid the debts of my father. But Allah saved all the heaps (of dates), so that when I looked at the heap where the Prophet had been sitting, it seemed as if a single date had not been taken away thereof."

Ali ibn Abi Talib era
He fought in all three major civil wars under Ali ibn Abi Talib: Battle of Jamal, Battle of Sifeen and Battle of Nahrawan.

Ali ibn Husayn's (ibn Ali) era (Shia doctrine)
Jabir had a long life and became blind in his old age. According to the Shias, he devoutly waited for the time when he would meet the fifth Imam. Each morning he would come out from his house, sit by the roadside and wait for the sound of the footsteps to recognize the fifth Imam. One such day while he was waiting in the street of Medina, he heard someone walking towards him, the sound of footsteps reminded him of the way Muhammad used to walk. Jabir stood up, stopped the man, and asked his name. He replied, “Muhammad”, Jabir asked, “whose son”? He replied “Ali ibn Hussain”. Jabir immediately recognized the man he was talking to was the 5th Imam. He kissed his hands and conveyed the message of Muhammad.

Abd al-Malik's era and Jabir’s death
It was during this era that he retold the Hadith of Umar's speech of forbidding Mut'ah. Jabir had a long life. According to shia sources he was poisoned by Al-Hajjaj ibn Yusuf when he was 94 in, because of his loyalty to Ahl al-Bayt. He died in 78 AH (697) in Medina, Saudi Arabia.

Legacy

He narrated about 1,547 Hadiths (some historians say). After the death of Muhammad he used to deliver lectures in Masjid Nabwi, Medina, Egypt, and Damascus. Such leading Tabi'en scholars as Amr ibn Dinar, Mujahid, Atiyya ibn Sa'd and Ata' ibn Abi Rabah attended his lectures. People gathered around him in Damascus and Egypt to learn about Muhammad and his Hadiths.Upon research it is said that he started and carried out the tradition of Arbaeen 1300 years ago.

List of narrated hadith
Hadith of Jesus Praying Behind Mahdi
Hadiths related to Mut'ah and An-Nisa, 24
Hadith of Ghadir Khumm
Hadith al-Thaqalayn
Hadith of Fatima tablet
A narration regarding Contraception

See also 
Ali ibn Abi Talib
Hassan ibn Ali
Hussain ibn Ali
Ali ibn Hussain
Muhammad ibn Ali
Mut'ah

References

Companions of the Prophet
Assassinated religious leaders
697 deaths
Year of birth unknown
Hadith scholars